American tea culture encompasses the methods of preparation and means of consumption of tea within the context of the culture of the United States.

American restaurants and workplaces typically offer machine-made drip brew coffee by default, while hot tea brewed by the cup with tea bags is available by request. Tea parties can be celebrated for many occasions, from the very small and intimate to the large family gatherings and celebrations.
In the U.S. south a regional favorite called sweet tea – which is brewed, sweetened, and chilled in advance of consumption – may be served at all meals and throughout the day as an alternate to other beverages. In the United States, about 85% of the tea consumed is served cold, or iced. Iced tea is more frequently consumed during periods of hot weather or in lower latitudes, and hot tea is likewise more common in colder weather. Any confusion when one is visiting different parts of the country can easily be solved by explicitly asking for either "hot tea" or "iced tea." Afternoon tea, as a meal, is rarely served in the U.S. except in ritualized special occasions such as the tea party or an afternoon out at a high-end hotel or restaurant, which may also offer cream tea on their menu.

History

The American tea culture is a part of the history of the United States, as this beverage appeals to all classes and has adapted to the customs of the United States of America.
In the Dutch colony of New Amsterdam, now known as New York, tea was served with the best silver strainers, the finest porcelain cups and pots, and wooden tea caddy. Tea became a very popular drink in the colonies, and tea ceremonies were common among all classes. In Salem, Massachusetts, tea leaves were boiled to create a bitter brew, then served as a vegetable side dish with butter. By the time of the American Revolution, tea was drunk everywhere from the backwoods to the cities.

The view of tea in American culture began to shift when the British government introduced the Townshend Acts in 1767. Tea was taxed as part of these laws which made it less affordable for the American people. However, cheaper tea was still smuggled into America. Later in 1773 the Tea Act was put into place which allowed the East India Company to gain a monopoly on tea sales in America by being able to sell tea at prices that were cheaper than both the colonial tea importers and smugglers. The British government did this to be able to continue to collect tea taxes from the American colonies. However, the British were unable to hide the tax from the colonies and only managed to enrage the colonists. This led to the Boston Tea Party, where tea was dumped into the Boston Harbor, and other public protests of shipments of tea. As a consequence, tea drinking became unpatriotic. Boycotts of tea led to an increase in consumption of other beverages, such as coffee or herbal teas infused with peppermint, sage or dandelions.

The American specialty tea market has quadrupled in the years from 1993 to 2008, now being worth $6.8 billion a year. Specialty tea houses and retailers also started to pop up during this period.

U. S. tea publications 

 TeaTime Magazine
 World Tea News 
 T Ching

American Tea Masters
The American Tea Masters Association was founded to provide mastery-level training, education, and professional certification to individuals desiring to become tea masters and tea sommeliers.

Iced tea

Iced tea is usually prepared from bagged tea. In addition to tea bags and loose tea, powdered "instant iced tea mix" is available in stores. This is made by preparing tea and then dehydrating it, similar to instant coffee. Iced tea can be purchased, like soda, in canned or bottled form at vending machines and convenience stores; usually, this pre-made tea is sweetened with corn syrup, and sometimes some other flavoring, such as lemon or raspberry, is added. Also, like other soft drinks, it can be purchased as a fountain drink, though in some establishments it is pumped from a bag-in-box, and in others, it is simply poured from a separate container that contains freshly brewed tea.

In restaurants, iced tea is usually served unsweetened except in the Southeastern United States where iced tea is much more common and is available both sweet and unsweetened and "iced tea" is often considered to be "sweet tea" unless otherwise specified. The reason for the presweetening is that it may be difficult to dissolve sugar in iced tea, even with constant stirring. The result can be insufficiently sweetened tea or gritty, undissolved sugar crystals in the tea.  Some restaurants have begun serving iced tea that has been pre-flavored with fruit essences, particularly passion fruit, often as the only iced tea made available.

Iced tea's popularity in the United States has led to an addition to standard cutlery sets; the iced tea spoon is a standard flatware teaspoon, but with a long handle, suitable for stirring sugar into the taller glasses commonly used for iced tea.

Tea bags

Roberta Lawson and Mary McLaren were given the patent for the tea bag.
 

Thomas Sullivan is credited with inventing tea bags in 1908. Sullivan, a New York tea importer, inadvertently invented tea bags when he sent tea samples to clients in small silk bags to cut costs, and they mistakenly steeped the bags whole.

The customers were more interested in the brewing convenience of the novel silk bags than his bulk teas. Sullivan did not realize this until they all started to complain that the orders they received were not in the same small bags the samples had been in. Silk was too expensive for everyday disposal; therefore, he invented tea bags made of gauze. The tea bag made of paper fiber was a later American invention.

The nylon pyramidal tea bag containing broken teas and semi-leaf teas made an appearance in the marketplace for aficionados. The pyramidal shape - it is said - allows more room for the leaf to steep. Environmentalists prefer silk to nylon because of the health and biodegradability issues.

Most tea sold in the United States is sold in bags, although loose leaf teas and iced are also available.

Instant tea
In 1946, Nestle USA introduced the first instant tea, Nestea.  Instant teas are produced from black tea by extracting the liquor from processed portion of tea typically from offgrade black teas; green tea in a smaller proportion has traditionally been used by the instant tea makers as a "clarification agent" - again, in effort to maximize the clarity of color and minimize off-colors created by certain teas that cloud. The extract is concentrated under low pressure, and drying the concentrate to a powder by freeze-drying, spray-drying, or vacuum-drying. Low temperatures tend to be used to minimize loss of flavor. The American market for instant tea powders, which developed quickly following Nestle's introduction, has slackened off considerably over the past quarter century, as Americans have more and more turned to naturally icing their favorite loose teas, as well as preparing iced tea from tea bags, and to ready-to-drink iced teas where the smaller sizes are found in the supermarkets' refrigerated drinks sections and the larger gallon sizes are found in the supermarkets' non-refrigerated drinks sections.

Revival of fine teas
Yellow and white teas became difficult to find in the United States and even green tea had become uncommon because of the People's Republic of China's ban on exports to the USA which was lifted in 1971. After the resumption of trade between mainland China and the US, these teas typical to China re-entered the American market for the first time since the first two decades of the 20th century.

In the early 1980s, a mini-revival of demand for better quality teas from all origins occurred in the United States. Prior to this time, much of the tea available in 20th century USA was blended specifically for gallon and half-gallon sized iced tea bags, with the quality of not "creaming down" (a creamy looking color that imparts to some teas after cooling down) when iced as a needed aspect; "clear-liquoring" teas were required.

Most iced tea blends in the USA have traditionally been made from the teas of Indonesia, Sri Lanka, Kenya, Argentina and Malawi. Even though there is no correlation between the quality of cloudy teas versus clear teas, clear iced teas were considered more attractive by the consumer.

A recent rise in the demand for orthodox tea in both gallon and half-gallon iced tea bags, as well as 500 and 1,000 gram loose tea packs has caused manufacturers to reinstate orthodox manufacturing methods. This is a departure from the more common Sri Lankan, Indonesian, Argentinian and other nations' orthodox rotorvane tea-making method which has limitations and can not produce whole leaf black tea. The rotorvane method was adopted primarily to satisfy the demand for the smaller leaf sizes that fit into small (1-2 gram) tea bag blends worldwide starting in the early 20th century.

Varieties of teas

Currently, there is a revival of interest in the many varieties of black teas throughout the United States.  Additionally, other exotic teas (such as the vast variety of African, Asian and South American teas) and different brewing styles are becoming more commonplace. Teas from all origins and elevations, made in all methods of manufacture, are popular in the US, a tea market which has traditionally been more flexible and willing to try new types of drinks than tea markets throughout the old world.

Decaffeinated tea is widely available in the United States, for those who wish to reduce the physiological effects of caffeine. There are many who are aware that the sales trend for decaf teas in the USA has shown a decreasing curve in demand at retail over the past 20 years, yet the high price of decaf remains unchanged. The reasons are twofold.

Not only is decaf tea more expensive than non-decaf tea, the processes of decaffeinating that is commonly used depletes a great deal of the flavor out of the tea. The teas with the highest caffeine content fall far below the coffees with the lowest caffeine content. In this light, and considering that most people would prefer to buy better quality teas rather than the less flavorful decaf teas, the American consumer has been buying decaf tea slightly less in recent years.  For those who are caffeine intolerant, however, the invention of decaffeinated tea has been welcomed as a refreshing and tasty alternative to caffeinated beverages.

U.S. regional tea traditions

Sweet tea
Sweet tea, with sugar or corn syrup added (usually while the tea is still hot from brewing), the mixture then being cooled with ice, is ubiquitous in the Southeastern United States. In these states, when a person says "tea", they normally mean sweetened iced tea. The unsweetened variant is often called "unsweet" tea instead of unsweetened or plain. The consumption of sweet tea with many meals leads to it sometimes called the "table wine of the South", and this trait is considered an important marker of the culture of the Southern United States. Southern sweet tea is made by brewing tea at double strength, adding a large amount of sugar to the freshly brewed hot tea, and diluting to the proper strength.  It is served over a glass full of ice cubes and is often garnished with a slice of lemon.  While high fructose corn syrup is commonly used as a sweetener for commercially manufactured tea, more often consumers are unaware of this, and when made at home, refined sugar is used.

In the Northern United States and the Western United States, "tea" generally means the hot beverage and iced tea is referred to by name.

Sun tea

Sun tea is frequently brewed in temperate areas by placing tea and room-temperature water together in a glass jar left outdoors in direct sunlight. Steeping times are necessarily long, two to four hours. Tea may also be brewed with no heat at all by simply immersing the tea bags or infuser in room-temperature water and allowing a period of several hours (typically overnight) for steeping.  Since sun brewing occurs in a temperature range that can promote the development of bacteria, particularly Alcaligenes viscolactis, the Centers for Disease Control and the Tea Association of the U.S.A. Inc. suggest storing sun-brewed tea in the refrigerator and discarding it after 24 hours.

Gallery

In popular culture

Architecture
Chester teapot, a teapot shaped building made in 1938, and billed as "world's largest" to represent a local pottery industry

Idioms
"Not my cup of tea" (not one's choice or preference)
"Tea" is used to refer to salacious or personal information or gossip in African American Vernacular English. Theories regarding the origin of the term vary, with one popular theory being that it originates from the practice of confiding with close friends at tea parties, a common practice in the American South.

Museums and tea farms
Charleston Tea Plantation, owned by the Bigelow Tea Company
Finger Lakes Tea Company in upstate New York 
East Texas Tea Company in Mount Vernon, Texas started tea cultivation in 2009 
Atealier (formerly East Texas Tea Company) in Coeur d'Alene, Idaho 
The Great Mississippi Tea Company in Brookhaven, Mississippi
Minto Island Tea Farm, Oregon
Sparta Teapot Museum, a former American museum of more than 6,000 teapots, closed a few years after a funding controversy

Music
"I'm a Little Teapot" (formally titled "The Teapot Song"), a children's song from 1939 and a related dance 
My Cup of Tea
""Tea for Two" (song), a song from the 1925 musical No, No, Nanette

See also
Argo Tea, Chicago based chain of tea cafés
Bigelow Tea Company, founded in 1945 in Connecticut with a tea blended with orange and spices, family owned
Celestial Seasonings, a pioneering American herbal tea company founded in Colorado, 1969
English Breakfast tea, named by an English-American tea merchant in 1843 in New York City  
The Great Atlantic & Pacific Tea Company, began in 1859 as a tea and coffee dealer in New York; also known as the giant supermarket chain "A&P"
The Great Mississippi Tea Company, an award-winning Mississippi based specialty tea farm and retailer. 
List of tea companies#United States
Luzianne, a Louisiana-based tea company that introduced an iced tea blend in 1932
Lynchburg Lemonade, a cocktail and long drink 
Salada tea, a tea company founded in Montreal, that built a headquarters in Boston in 1917
Snapple, an American brand of tea and juice drinks which is owned by Dr Pepper Snapple Group and based in Plano, Texas
Stash Tea Company, a large specialty tea company based in Oregon
Tazo, a tea & herbal tea manufacturer and distributor founded in Portland, OR
Tea production in the United States
Tearoom (U.K. and U.S.)

Bibliography
Griffiths, John (2011). Tea: A History of the Drink that Changed the World. London: Carlton Publishing. pp. 16,18,63, 78–79, 106.
Hale, Sarah Josepha Buell (1841). Early American Cookery. Boston: The Good Housekeeper. p. 112.
Heiss, M.L and Heiss, R.J. (2007). The Story of Tea: A cultural history and drinking guide. Berkeley, CA: 10 Speed Press. p. 80.
Mair, Victor and Hoh, Erling (2009). The true history of tea. New York: Thames and Hudson. p. 201.
Stern, Tracy (2007). Tea Party: 20 Themed Tea parties with recipes for every occasion, from fabulous showers to intimate gatherings. New York: Random House. pp. 12–18.

References

Tea culture by country
Tea
Culture
Tea
Tea
Cultural history of the United States